David Richards (1910 – date of death unknown) was a Welsh professional footballer who played as a left half-back. He made appearances in the English Football League for Welsh clubs Merthyr Town, Wrexham and Newport County. He also was registered to Aston Villa, Middlesbrough and Bolton Wanderers - but never appeared for any of them.

References

1910 births
Date of death unknown
Welsh footballers
Association football defenders
English Football League players
Merthyr Town F.C. players
Aston Villa F.C. players
Middlesbrough F.C. players
Bolton Wanderers F.C. players
Wrexham A.F.C. players
Newport County A.F.C. players
Burton Town F.C. players